Frederick Jerome Work (c. 1879 - 1942) was a collector, arranger ("harmonizer"), and composer of songs in the United States. He was part of a family of musicians and published a collection of "Negro spirituals" with his brother John Wesley Work.

He worked at Fisk University and with its the Jubilee Singers and toured with another singing group he conducted. He played the piano. He was photographed at Albert Coombs Barnes home in 1940.

He was born in Nashville, Tennessee.

Books
New Jubilee Songs, as sung by the Fisk Jubilee Singers of Fisk University 2nd ed. Collected and Harmonized by Frederick J. Work (1904)
 Folk songs of the American Negro with John Wesley Work with John Wesley Work II

Songs
"Wade in the Water"
"Out of the Depths"

See also
Julian Work
Monroe Work

References

American songwriters
African-American musicians
Fisk University people
1879 births
1942 deaths
Year of birth uncertain